The 2015 KNSB Dutch Allround Championships in speed skating were held in Heerenveen at the Thialf ice skating rink from 27 December to 28 December 2014. The tournament was part of the 2014–2015 speed skating season. Sven Kramer and Irene Wüst won the allround titles.

Schedule

Medalists

Allround

Distance

Classification

Men's allround

Women's allround

Source:

References

KNSB Dutch Allround Championships
KNSB Dutch Allround Championships
2015 Allround
KNSB Dutch Allround Championships, 2015
2010s in Amsterdam
December 2014 sports events in Europe